Minotetrastichus frontalis is a species of chalcid wasp in the family Eulophidae.

References

Further reading

External links

 

Eulophidae
Insects described in 1834